Fishburn is a village and civil parish in County Durham, England.

Fishburn may also refer to:

People
 Dudley Fishburn (born 1946), business man with strong links to the not-for-profit world
 M. S. Fishburn (1844–1926), American politician
 Peter C. Fishburn (1936–2021), pioneer in the field of decision-making processes
 Sam Fishburn (1893–1965), American Major League Baseball player

Other
 Fishburn Airfield, a small grass strip airfield in Fishburn, County Durham
 Fishburn Grassland, a Site of Special Scientific Interest in the Sedgefield district of County Durham, England
 Fishburn (ship), one of at least two vessels by that name

See also
 Fishburne (disambiguation)
 Fishbourne (disambiguation)